Svein Egil Solvang (born 1 May 1968) is a Norwegian sprint canoer who competed in the late 1980s. He finished eighth in the K-2 1000 m event at the 1988 Summer Olympics in Seoul.

He resides in Flekkefjord.

References
Sports-Reference.com profile

1968 births
Living people
Norwegian male canoeists
Canoeists at the 1988 Summer Olympics
Olympic canoeists of Norway
People from Flekkefjord
Sportspeople from Agder